The Hyundai 8 to 25-ton truck (hangul:현대트럭) is a line of heavy-duty commercial vehicles by Hyundai Motor Company. The range was primarily available as cargo and dump truck. Its model truck name is 'Hyundai' and 'Hyundai Mitsubishi Fuso'.

Most heavy-duty truck models are distinguishable by a front 'Hyundai Truck' badge, but the common Hyundai and Mitsubishi Fuso badge is usually used on the rear.

In Japan, Asia-Pacific, Mid-East, Africa, South America, its principal competitors are Daewoo 8 to 25-ton trucks, Tata Daewoo Novus, Samsung SM510/530.

Models
Hyundai Truck (8ton~25ton Truck) is a name used by Hyundai Motor Company in commercial vehicle of trucks for two related models.
Hyundai Truck: a cargo truck & dump truck, Designed by Mitsubishi Fuso Truck and Bus Corporation. Manufacture period: 1977–1994. Rebadged by Mitsubishi Fuso The Great.
8 ton Cargo
11 ton Cargo
9.5 ton Cargo (launched in 1988)
18 ton Cargo (launched in 1992)
8 ton Dump
15 ton Dump
23 ton Dump (launched in 1992)
Mixer
Tractor
Hyundai Truck New Model: a cargo truck & dump truck, Designed by Hyundai Motor Company and Mitsubishi Fuso Truck and Bus Corporation. Manufacture period: 1994–1997.
8 ton Cargo
8.5 ton Cargo
9.5 ton cargo
11 ton Cargo
11.5 ton Cargo
12 ton Cargo
13 ton Cargo
14 ton Cargo
15 ton Cargo
16 ton cargo
17 ton Cargo
18 ton Cargo
19 ton Cargo
19.5 ton Cargo
22 ton cargo
22.5 ton Cargo
23 ton Cargo
23.5 ton Cargo
25 ton Cargo
8 ton Dump
11 ton Dump
15 ton Dump
23 ton Dump
24 ton Dump
6x2 Mixer
8x4 Mixer
6x2 Tractor
6x4 Tractor

See also
Hyundai Motor Company
Mitsubishi Fuso Truck and Bus Corporation
Hyundai Super Truck
Hyundai New Power Truck

References 

8 to 25 ton Truck
Rear-wheel-drive vehicles